The 1949 SMU Mustangs football team was an American football team that represented Southern Methodist University (SMU) as a member of the Southwest Conference (SWC) during the 1949 college football season. In their 12th and final season under head coach Matty Bell, the Mustangs compiled a 5–4–1 record (2–3–1 against conference opponents) and outscored opponents by a total of 215 to 204. The team opened the season, 5–1–1, and reached No. 10 in the AP Poll, but lost the final three games of the season and ended up unranked. The team played its home games at the Cotton Bowl in Dallas.

Backs Doak Walker and Kyle Rote were selected by both the Associated Press (AP) and United Press (UP) on the 1949 All-Southwest Conference football team.

Schedule

References

SMU
SMU Mustangs football seasons
SMU Mustangs football